Fewkes is a surname.  It can refer to:

People
 Alfred Fewkes (1837—1912), English cricketer
 Jesse Walter Fewkes (1850—1930), US anthropologist, archaeologist, writer, and naturalist
 John Fewkes (boxer), professional boxer and trainer
 John M. Fewkes (1901—1992), founding president of the Chicago Teachers Union

Places
 , valley in Montezuma County, Colorado
 , valley in Summit County, Utah
 Fewkes Group Archaeological Site in Tennessee, named in Jesse Walter Fewkes honor

Fewkes